Rodolfo Combe Arriola (born 4 January 1995) is a Uruguayan professional footballer who plays as a forward for Deportivo Español.

Club career
Combe, having left Uruguay aged eleven, began his career in Argentina with Vélez Sarsfield. He never made a senior appearance for the club, though was on the substitutes bench for Primera División fixtures with Atlético de Rafaela and Colón in August 2015; as well as in the Copa Argentina versus Acassuso. On 22 July 2016, Combe was loaned to Primera B Metropolitana's Fénix. His professional debut came in a loss to Platense on 4 September, on the way to seven total appearances for them; with his first goal coming in his last match, versus Colegiales in October. Despite no further games, he remained with Fénix until June 2017.

In August 2018, Combe switched Vélez Sarsfield for Deportivo Español; in a permanent deal. Fourteen appearances followed across the 2018–19 campaign as they suffered relegation.

International career
In December 2014, Combe was selected for Fabián Coito's preliminary squad ahead of the 2015 South American U-20 Championship; though he wasn't picked for the final tournament.

Career statistics
.

References

External links

1995 births
Living people
People from Carmelo, Uruguay
Uruguayan footballers
Association football forwards
Uruguayan expatriate footballers
Expatriate footballers in Argentina
Uruguayan expatriate sportspeople in Argentina
Primera B Metropolitana players
Club Atlético Vélez Sarsfield footballers
Club Atlético Fénix players
Deportivo Español footballers